Bogarra is a municipality in Albacete, Castilla-La Mancha, Spain. It has a population of 1,235. The town is approximately 78 km from the main city of Albacete.

Bogarra is situated in a fertile valley containing several rivers and many fields. 
The main foodstuffs produced in the area are olives and almonds, along with other fruits such as grapes and figs. In antiquity, Bogarra was a Bastetani settlement then called Bigerra.

See also 
 Sphinx of Haches

References
Smith, William; Dictionary of Greek and Roman Geography, London, (1854)

Municipalities of the Province of Albacete